The House at 12 West Water Street in Wakefield, Massachusetts is a rare local example of a Second Empire house.  The wood-frame house was built around 1860, and has two full stories, and a third beneath the mansard roof.  It is three bays wide, with a wide double-door entry, and a porch across the front with elaborately decorated posts.  The house may have been built by Cyrus Wakefield, owner of the Wakefield Rattan Company, and sold to a company employee.  A later owner was George Cox, who owned a billiard parlor in the town center.

The house was listed on the National Register of Historic Places in 1989.

See also
National Register of Historic Places listings in Wakefield, Massachusetts
National Register of Historic Places listings in Middlesex County, Massachusetts

References

Houses in Wakefield, Massachusetts
Houses on the National Register of Historic Places in Wakefield, Massachusetts
Second Empire architecture in Massachusetts
Houses completed in 1860
Buildings with mansard roofs